The Oca river is a short river, about  long, in the north of Spain. It is an affluent of the Ebro river that flows through the province of Burgos. It begins in the Sistema Ibérico range and flows north through the municipalities of Rábanos, Villafranca Montes de Oca, Valle de Oca, Alcocero de Mola, Prádanos de Bureba, Briviesca, Vileña, the shire of Bureba and Oña.

The Oca River rises in the comarca of Montes de Oca, near the town of Rábanos. Near its source, the river passes through the narrow, rock-lined gorge of La Hoz.

Affluents

From the right, the Oca receives the waters of the river Matapán and the streams Valsorda and Penches, while on the left it receives the waters of the rivers Cerratón, Anguilas and Homino, and the streams Valdazo and Hoyo.

See also
 Province of Burgos
 Montes de Oca (comarca)
 Oca River, Biscay

References
 Ebro's Water Planning Office

Rivers of Spain
Ebro basin
Rivers of Burgos
Rivers of Castile and León